Theta Alpha Kappa is the national honor society for religious studies and theology. It was founded in 1976 at Manhattan College in Riverdale (the Bronx), New York City to recognize the academic achievements of religion and theology students. Currently Theta Alpha Kappa has more than two hundred chapters nationally in four-year educational institutions ranging from small religiously affiliated colleges to large public research institutions. It is the only national honor society dedicated to recognizing academic excellence in baccalaureate and post-baccalaureate students and in scholars in the fields of religious studies and theology.

Theta Alpha Kappa sponsors scholarship awards and fellowship competitions; including an undergraduate achievement award, and a graduate fellowship award. Theta Alpha Kappa publishes the Journal of Theta Alpha Kappa, which offers an annual prize and the publication of outstanding student papers.

Theta Alpha Kappa is an affiliated society of the American Academy of Religion, a member of the Association of College Honor Societies, and a member of the Council of Societies for the Study of Religion.

Chapters
Theta Alpha Kappa has 360 chapters.

References

 http://thetaalphakappa.org accessed on 11 November 2021

External links
 Official Site
 Association of College Honor Societies: Theta Alpha Kappa
  Theta Alpha Kappa chapter list at ACHS

Association of College Honor Societies
Student organizations established in 1976
1976 establishments in New York City